The Convocation Hall or Cowasji Jehangir Convocation Hall at the University of Mumbai is part of the Victorian buildings complex around the Oval Maidan in Mumbai that is a UNESCO World Heritage Site. It was built between 1869 and 1874, and designed by Sir George Gilbert Scott, who incidentally never visited Bombay and worked from London.

It is also known as the Cowasji Jehangir Convocation Hall, after the Parsi philanthropist Cowasji Jehangir Readymoney, who funded the construction. In 2006–07, the hall was restored by a team led by the conservation architect Abha Narain Lambah. The project was given the Award of Distinction under the UNESCO Asia-Pacific Awards for Cultural Heritage Conservation.

Gallery

References

The Victorian and Art Deco Ensemble of Mumbai
1874 establishments in India
Gothic Revival architecture in India
Buildings and structures completed in 1874
Venetian Gothic architecture
University of Mumbai